The Arlington Heights Army Air Defense Site was a Project Nike Missile Master site near Chicago, Illinois. It operated from 1960 until 1968.

Installation started in late 1959 after the United States Army had purchased .  Adjacent to the Arlington Heights Air Force Station, the Arlington Heights Army Installation opened on October 28, 1960, as the 8th of 10 Army Air Defense Command Posts (AADCP) to have a Martin AN/FSG-1 Antiaircraft Defense System installed for Nike-Hercules command and control.  In addition to the Army's 2 AN/FPS-6 radars, the radars of the co-located USAF station provided AADCP data for the 45th Artillery Brigade's control of the Chicago-Gary Defense Area (10 missile batteries and their Integrated Fire Control sites).  The vacuum tube AN/FSG-1 was replaced  with a solid-state Hughes AN/TSQ-51 Air Defense Command and Coordination System, which controlled the combined Chicago-Milwaukee Defense Area after the Milwaukee Defense Area merged with Chicago-Gary in 1968.  

A May 1979 golf course was built near the nuclear bunker—the Arlington Lakes Golf Club has  with 14 lakes.

Site locations
Nuclear bunker
Co-located IFC site 
Co-located launch site

Notes

References

1959 establishments in Illinois

1959 in military history
1974 disestablishments
1974 in military history
Buildings and structures in Cook County, Illinois
Military installations in Illinois
U.S. Army Nike sites